Zhostovo painting (Russian: Жостовская роспись) is an old Russian folk handicraft of painting on metal trays, which still exists in a village of Zhostovo in the Moscow Oblast. It appeared in the early 19th century mainly under the influence of the Ural handicraft of flower painting on metal. Subsequent development of the Zhostovo painting handicraft was stylistically related to porcelain and enamel painting techniques, used by factories near Moscow, flower motifs on printed cotton, produced by the Ivanovo factories, and Lukutin miniature (see Fedoskino miniature).

History 
History of Zhostovo and its handicraft dates back to early 18th century, when Ossip Filippovich Vishnyakov opened his workshop in Zhostovo in 1825. The Vishnyakov workshop sold products made from papier-mache including boxes, cigar cases, and trays.

19's century, when in some of Moscows's suburbs and villages of former Troitsk oblast were appeared some workshops for manufacturing painted lacquered products made of papier-mache. Traditions of its painting are in Tagil painting which was appeared in the earlier 18 century. In 1922 «Novoseltsevo work artel» was founded in Novoseltsevo for produce lacquered metal trays; in 1924 «Zhostovo work artel» and «Spetskustar» were founded there; «Lakirovshik» and «Svoy trud» were founded at the same time in 1925 and then all of them were united in 1925 to «Metallopodnos».

1920—1930 were hard for Zhostovo. Common trends of Soviet art of hard standing to modern and realism led to change traditional way of art and applying to Zhostovo patterns of ornaments and conceptual art which were made by professional artists without considering folk art. But lead artist understood the danger of foreignness additions to folk art and managed to resist and lead new ideas to it.

Earlier Zhostovo painting was just as a houseware, but now it's independent type of decoration and the craft which was only merchant's hobby was raised to unique unit of Russian folk art. Today, it is called the Zhostovo Factory of Decorative Painting (Жостовская фабрика декоративной росписи).

Production process 
Zhostovo painting is a handicraft of painting on metal trays, preliminary coated with a few layers of priming (putty) and oil varnish (usually, black). Painting is done in a few consecutive energetic and firm strokes with a soft brush and oil paints, richly diluted with linseed oil. The most widely used motif of the Zhostovo painting is a bunch of mixed garden and wild flowers, which is simple and laconic in its essence. The edges of a tray are painted with a light golden ornament called уборка (uborka). A finished tray is then  covered with three layers of light lacquer and polished to brilliance.

References

External links 
 http://www.zhostovo.ru - Official site of Zhostovo decorative art manufactory

Russian handicrafts
Russian inventions
Mytishchinsky District